In taxonomy, Aeropyrum is a genus of the Desulfurococcaceae.

Etymology
The name Aeropyrum derives from:Greek noun aer, aeros (ἀήρ, ἀέρος), air; Greek neuter gender noun pur, fire; New Latin neuter gender noun Aeropyrum, air fire, referring to the hyperthermophilic respirative character of the organism.

Species
The genus contains 2 species (including basonyms and synonyms), namely
 A. camini ( Nakagawa et al. 2004, ; Latin genitive case noun camini, of a chimney, relating to its isolation from a hydrothermal vent chimney.)
 A. pernix ( Sako et al. 1996,  (Type species of the genus).; Latin neuter gender adjective pernix, nimble, active, agile, indicating high motility in microscopic inspection.)

See also
 Bacterial taxonomy
 Microbiology

References

Further reading

Scientific journals

Scientific books

Scientific databases

External links

Archaea genera
Thermoproteota